La fièvre is the title of a set of short stories written in French by French Nobel laureate J. M. G. Le Clézio and translated into English by Daphne Woodward as Fever and published by Atheneum in the US and Hamish Hamilton in the UK.

Contents
A collection of nine short stories or novellas. The Nobel Prize in Literature 2008 Bio-bibliography mentions this as one of the books in which the author "alludes to his own perception of the trouble and fear reigning in some cities in the western world".
Introductory Letter (by Le Clézio);
La fièvre (Fever)
Le jour où Beaumont fit connaissance avec sa douleur (The Day that Beaumont became Acquainted with his Pain)
me semble que le bateau se dirige vers lîle (It Seems to Me the Boat is Heading for the Island)
 (Backwards)
 (The Walking Man)
 Martin (Martin)
 (The World is Alive)
 (Then I shall be able to Find Peace and Slumber)
 (A Day of Old Age)

Publication history

First French language edition 
This French language collection of short stories

Second French language edition

First English translation

References

1965 short story collections
Short story collections by J. M. G. Le Clézio
Works by J. M. G. Le Clézio